The Ipswich Courthouse is located at 43 Ellenborough Street, Ipswich, Queensland, Australia. The five-storey complex houses magistrates court and support facilities, police prosecutions offices and a fully operational watch house. 
It was opened in 2009/2010.

This is the third courthouse for the city and replaced the second courthouse located in East Street, Ipswich that had been constructed in 1982. The first courthouse still exists at 73-75 East Street and is heritage-listed.

The new courthouse features: 
eight magistrates courtrooms
three district courtrooms
a large public waiting area
fully integrated AV systems including videoconferencing facilities
vulnerable witness suites and evidence pre-recording facilities

The building was designed by Ainsley Bell Murchison (ABM) Architects and Cox Rayner Architects.

Awards
FDG Stanley Award for Public Architecture, AIA QLD 2010
GHM Addison Award for Interior Architecture, AIA QLD 2010
State Award for Art & Architecture, AIA QLD 2010

References

External links
 Building at ABM Architects website
Building at Jensen Bowers website

Courthouses in Queensland
Ipswich, Queensland
Government buildings completed in 2010